Excoecaria grahamii is a species of flowering plant in the family Euphorbiaceae. It was described in 1906. It is native to western tropical Africa.

References

grahamii
Plants described in 1906
Flora of Africa